Monsters Inside: The 24 Faces of Billy Milligan is a 2021 docuseries about Billy Milligan, released on Netflix on 22 September 2021. It stars Kathy Preston, Bob Ruth and Sheila Porter.

Synopsis
Billy Milligan was arrested in 1977 for a series of robberies, kidnappings, and rapes of three women on the Ohio State University campus. Despite evidence suggesting he had committed the crimes, Milligan had no memories of the assaults, appearing to exhibit continually changing personality traits. This resulted in a team of psychiatrists diagnosing him as having dissociative identity disorder. His lawyers pleaded insanity, claiming two of his initial 10 personalities committed the crimes without Milligan's knowledge. Milligan was acquitted but spent the next decade in mental hospitals, where he was diagnosed with an additional 14 personalities. He was released in 1988, then discharged from the Ohio mental health system and Ohio courts in 1991. His life outside the system of trying to lead a normal life is also discussed.

Cast 
 Kathy Preston
 Bob Ruth
 Sheila Porter
 Frank W. Putnam
 Allen J. Frances
 Bobby Lacer
 Jim Morrison
 Bernard Yavitch
 Sharon Lansing
 Cornelia B. Wilbur
 Jack Ward
 Pam Flynn
 Jamie Schmerbeck
 Ron O'Brien
 George Harding
 Jim Murray
 David Malawista
 Terry Sherman
 Rob Baumgardt
 Mikkel Borch-Jacobsen
 Beverly Lynn
 Ronald Litvak
 Colin Ross
 Marlene Kocan

Episodes

References

External links
 
 

2021 American television series debuts
2021 American television series endings
2020s American documentary television series
Documentary television series about crime in the United States
English-language Netflix original programming
Netflix original documentary television series